The 1979 English Leather Grand Prix, also known as the Stowe Tennis Grand Prix, was a men's tennis tournament played on outdoor hard courts at the Topnotch Inn in Stowe, Vermont in the United States that was part of the 1979 Grand Prix circuit. It was the second edition of the tournament and was held from August 13 through August 19, 1979. First-seeded Jimmy Connors won his second consecutive singles title at the event.

Finals

Singles
 Jimmy Connors defeated  Mike Cahill 6–0, 6–1
 It was Connors' 6th singles title of the year and the 77th of his career.

Doubles
 Mike Cahill /  Steve Krulevitz defeated  Anand Amritraj/  Colin Dibley 3–6, 6–3, 6–4

References

Stowe Grand Prix
Stowe Grand Prix